Cueta is an antlion genus in the family Myrmeleonidae.

Species 
The genus has about 74 species.

Gallery

References

External links 

Myrmeleontidae
Myrmeleontidae genera